Adeliini is a tribe of beetles in the subfamily Lagriinae, family Tenebrionidae. The same name has been used for a tribe of wasps, but Adeliini Kirby, 1828 has priority.

References

Tenebrionidae